The Samsung SCH-R810 Finesse is a mobile phone by Samsung released in 2009. The successor to the Finesse is the Samsung Caliber (RCH-860).

The RCH-R810 is carried by MetroPCS and Pocket Communications.

References

Samsung mobile phones
Mobile phones introduced in 2009